Juho Matsalu (22 August 1911 – 1 August 1987) was an Estonian footballer. He played in 14 matches for the Estonia national football team from 1937 to 1940. He was also named in Estonia's squad for the Group 1 qualification tournament for the 1938 FIFA World Cup.

References

External links
 

1911 births
1987 deaths
People from Sindi, Estonia
People from Kreis Pernau
Estonian footballers
Estonia international footballers
Association football midfielders